Richard Lennox (born 14 August 1938) is a Canadian sailor. He competed in the Flying Dutchman event at the 1964 Summer Olympics.

References

External links
 

1938 births
Living people
Canadian male sailors (sport)
Olympic sailors of Canada
Sailors at the 1964 Summer Olympics – Flying Dutchman
Place of birth missing (living people)